Fintan O'Toole (born 16 February 1958) is a polemicist, literary editor, journalist and drama critic for The Irish Times, for which he has written since 1988. O'Toole was drama critic for the New York Daily News from 1997 to 2001 and is a regular contributor to The New York Review of Books. He is also an author, literary critic, historical writer and political commentator. 

O'Toole was born in Dublin, grew up in a working-class family and was educated at University College Dublin. In 2011, he was named by The Observer as one of "Britain's top 300 intellectuals", although he does not live in the UK. In 2012 and 2013 O'Toole was a visiting lecturer in Irish letters at Princeton University in Princeton, New Jersey and contributed to the Fund for Irish Studies Series.

Early life and career
O'Toole was born in Dublin and was educated at Scoil Íosagáin and Coláiste Chaoimhín in Crumlin (both run by the Christian Brothers) and at University College Dublin. He graduated from the university in 1978 with a BA in English and Philosophy. 

Soon after graduation, he became drama critic of In Dublin magazine in 1980. He joined the Sunday Tribune on its relaunch by Vincent Browne in 1983, and worked as its drama critic, literary editor, arts editor, and feature writer. From 1986 to 1987 he edited Magill magazine.

He joined The Irish Times as a columnist in 1988 and his columns have appeared twice-weekly ever since. He took a sabbatical in 1990–1991 to work as literary adviser to the Abbey Theatre. In 1994 he was one of the presenters for the last season of BBC TV's The Late Show. From 1997 to 2001 he was drama critic of the Daily News in New York. In 2011, he was appointed as literary editor of The Irish Times. He also has published articles regularly in the New York Review of Books, and The Guardian.

In 2017 he was commissioned by Faber and Faber to write the official biography of Seamus Heaney. O'Toole said of the process that his “one terror is that [Heaney's] favourite communication mode was the fax, and faxes fade."

In 2018, he was awarded the UCD Alumni Award in Arts & Humanities.

Views

O'Toole has criticised what he sees as negative attitudes toward immigration in Ireland, the state of Ireland's public services, growing inequality during Ireland's economic boom, the Iraq War, and the U.S. military's use of Shannon Airport, among many other issues. In 2006, he spent six months reporting for The Irish Times in China.

His former editor, Geraldine Kennedy, was paid more than the editor of the UK's top non-tabloid newspaper, The Daily Telegraph, which has a circulation about nine times that of The Irish Times. Later, O'Toole told a rival Irish paper, the Sunday Independent: 
We as a paper are not shy of preaching about corporate pay and fat cats but with this, there is a sense of excess. Some of the sums mentioned are disturbing. This is not an attack on Ms Kennedy, it is an attack on the executive level of pay. There is double-standard of seeking more job cuts while paying these vast salaries.

In June 2012, O'Toole compared the Irish Constitutional Convention to the American Citizens Union, a reformist political organisation that the New York City political machine Tammany Hall did not bother suppressing so long as it did not threaten its hegemony.

In August 2019, after the selection of Boris Johnson as Prime Minister of the United Kingdom, O'Toole proposed to get Parliament to back an alternative Cabinet who would push back the October deadline for Brexit to allow a trade deal to be negotiated. The proposal required seven Sinn Féin MPs in northern Irish border constituencies to resign in favour of a pact between the four largest anti-Brexit parties in Ireland, thereby triggering by-elections at a certain date in mid-September. O’Toole believed they would result in a more hardline anti-Brexit parliamentary faction that would make a stronger case for a no-confidence vote in Johnson. The proposal received sharp criticism from Sinn Féin leader Mary Lou McDonald, who claimed the existing anti-Brexit factions in Parliament were strong enough without the party making too many policy concessions.

A 26 June 2018 column in The Irish Times by O'Toole examined how the Trump administration's policies, as well as public-facing communications concerning immigration and asylum-seekers from Mexico, might be deliberately calculated to bring elements of fascism to the world's leading democracy.  An April 2020 column in The Irish Times asserted that the destruction of the public image and reputation of the United States by Donald Trump culminated with his bungling of the COVID-19 pandemic crisis, and that subsequently pity was the only appropriate feeling for the American people, the majority of whom had not voted for him.

Selected publications

Books 
 
 A Mass for Jesse James: A Journey Through 1980s Ireland, 1990
 Black Hole, Green Card: The Disappearance of Ireland, 1994
 Meanwhile Back at the Ranch: The Politics of Irish Beef, 1994
 Macbeth & Hamlet, 1995
 A Traitor’s Kiss: The Life of Richard Brinsley Sheridan, 1997
 The Ex-Isle of Ireland: Images of a Global Ireland, 1997
 The Lie of the Land, 1998
 The Irish Times Book of the Century, 1999
 Shakespeare is Hard But So is Life, 2002
 Contributor, Granta 77: What We Think of America, 2002
 "Jubilee", Granta 79: Celebrity, 2002
 After The Ball, 2003
 Post Washington: Why America Can't Rule the World, 2005 (with Tony Kinsella)
 White Savage: William Johnson and the Invention of America, 2005
 The Irish Times Book of The 1916 Rising, 2006 (with Shane Hegarty)
 Ship of Fools, How Stupidity And Corruption Sank The Celtic Tiger, 2009
 Enough is Enough: How to Build a New Republic, 2010
 Up the Republic!: Towards a New Ireland (editor), 2012
 A History of Ireland in 100 Objects, 2013
 Modern Ireland in 100 Artworks, 2016
 Judging Shaw, 2017
 Heroic Failure: Brexit and the Politics of Pain, 2018
 The Politics of Pain: Postwar England and the Rise of Nationalism, 2019
 We Don't Know Ourselves: A Personal History of Ireland Since 1958, 2021

Articles
 Fintan O'Toole, "The King of Little England", The New York Review of Books, vol. LXVIII, no. 10 (10 June 2021), pp. 44–46. About Boris Johnson.

Awards
 1993 AT Cross Award for Supreme Contribution to Irish Journalism
 1994 Justice Award of the Incorporated Law Society
 2000 Millennium Social Inclusion Award
 2012 TV3 Tonight Show Journalist of the Year
 2013 Irish Book Awards (Best Irish Published Book of the Year), A History of Ireland in 100 Objects
 2014 GALA Journalist/Broadcaster Award
 2014 Awarded Honorary Doctorate in Letters for services to broadcasting by Queen's University Belfast
 2017 European Press Prize (Commentator Award)
 2017 Orwell Prize for Journalism
 2017 Awarded Honorary Doctorate in Laws by NUI Galway 
 2017 NewsBrands Ireland Journalism Awards Broadsheet Columnist of the Year
2018 NewsBrands Ireland Journalism Awards Broadsheet Columnist of the Year
2019 Awarded Honorary Doctorate in Letters by Trinity College Dublin
2020 NewsBrands Ireland Journalism Awards Broadsheet Columnist of the Year
2020 Member of the Royal Irish Academy
2021 Irish Book Awards (Best Non-Fiction Book of the Year) for We Don’t Know Ourselves: A Personal History of Ireland Since 1958

References

External links
 The New York Review of Books: Fintan O'Toole
 New York State Writers Institute: Fintan O'Toole
 Guardian Unlimited: In the valley of the Mohawk A review of White Savage

1958 births
Living people
20th-century Irish people
21st-century Irish people
Alumni of University College Dublin
Irish columnists
Irish journalists
Irish literary critics
Irish political writers
Irish theatre critics
The Irish Times people
Irish writers
Magill people
Members of the Royal Irish Academy
New York Daily News people
The New York Review of Books people
People from Crumlin, Dublin
Abbey Theatre
European Press Prize winners